Nioella aestuarii is a bacterium from the genus of Nioella which has been isolated from  tidal flat sediments from Muuido in Korea.

References

External links
Type strain of Nioella aestuarii at BacDive -  the Bacterial Diversity Metadatabase

Rhodobacteraceae
Bacteria described in 2017